Moussa Djenepo (born 15 June 1998) is a Malian professional footballer who plays as a winger or an attacking midfielder for Premier League club Southampton and the Mali national team.

Club career

Early career
Djenepo began his career at Yeelen Olympique in Mali.

Standard Liège
On 31 January 2017, Djenepo joined Standard Liège on loan, with an option to buy. The club activated his buyout clause on 30 May 2017, hence making the transfer move permanent. He made his professional debut with Standard Liège in a 4–0 loss in the Belgian First Division A to Club Brugge on 27 August 2017. Djenepo netted his first goal on 11 March 2018, in a 3–2 away victory against Oostende at Versluys Arena.

On 17 March 2018, Djenepo played when he came on as a substitute for Mehdi Carcela, as Standard Liège beat Genk 1–0 after extra time to win the 2018 Belgian Cup Final and qualify for the UEFA Europa League.

Southampton
On 13 June 2019, Djenepo signed a four-year contract with Premier League club Southampton for a reported fee of £14 million. He scored his first goal for the Saints on 24 August 2019, in a 2–0 win over Brighton & Hove Albion. Djenepo scored his second goal for the club in a 1–0 victory against Sheffield United, which was voted as goal of the month in September 2019. On 7 March 2020, Djenepo was given a red card against Newcastle after Graham Scott checked the pitchside monitor.

Djenepo scored his first goal of the 2020–21 season in a 2–0 win over West Bromwich Albion.

On 14 September 2022, Southampton announced Djenepo had signed a new three-year contract until 2025.

International career
Djenepo is a youth international for the Mali under-20 team, appearing in the 2017 Africa U-20 Cup of Nations.

Djenepo received his first call-up to the senior team on 3 October 2017. He made his debut on 6 October, in a goalless 2018 FIFA World Cup qualification match with Ivory Coast. On 23 March 2019, Djenepo scored against South Sudan in a 2019 Africa Cup of Nations qualification home fixture, which ended in a 3–0 victory.

Career statistics

Club

International

As of match played 11 November 2021. Mali score listed first, score column indicates score after each Djenepo goal.

Honours
Standard Liège
Belgian Cup: 2017–18
Belgian Super Cup runner-up: 2018

Individual
Premier League Goal of the Month: September 2019

References

External links

Moussa Djenepo at Standard Liège

Living people
1998 births
Sportspeople from Bamako
Association football midfielders
Association football wingers
Malian footballers
Mali under-20 international footballers
Mali international footballers
Standard Liège players
Southampton F.C. players
Belgian Pro League players
Malian expatriate footballers
Malian expatriate sportspeople in Belgium
Malian expatriate sportspeople in England
Expatriate footballers in Belgium
Expatriate footballers in England
2019 Africa Cup of Nations players
2021 Africa Cup of Nations players
Premier League players
21st-century Malian people